Hariata Whakatau Pitini-Morera (1871–1938) was a New Zealand Māori leader, genealogist, historian, conservationist and weaver. Of Māori descent, she identified with the Ngāi Tahu and Ngati Mamoe iwi. She was born in Little River, North Canterbury, New Zealand in about 1871.

Hariata Whakatau Pitini-Morera was the grandmother of Wharetutu Te Aroha Stirling - a notable New Zealand tribal leader and conservationist.

References

1871 births
1938 deaths
New Zealand conservationists
Ngāi Tahu people
New Zealand Māori writers
New Zealand women historians
New Zealand genealogists
New Zealand Māori weavers
Kāti Māmoe people
20th-century New Zealand historians
19th-century women textile artists
19th-century textile artists